The Albanian Democratic Union (BDSh) is an Albanian minority party in North Macedonia. It was founded in September 2007 by former Kosovo Liberation Army member Bardhyl Mahmuti.

External links
Official web site

Albanian political parties in North Macedonia
Political parties established in 2007
2007 establishments in the Republic of Macedonia